Athie is a surname. Notable people with the surname include:

Antonio Díaz Athié (born 1958), Mexican politician
Carlos Athié (born 1987), Mexican actor, model, and TV presenter
Kamel Athie Flores (born 1950), Mexican politician
Mamoudou Athie (born 1988), Mauritanian-American actor